Tronchetto (also known as Isola nuova, meaning "New island") is an artificial island in the Venetian Lagoon, northern Italy, located at the westernmost tip of the main Venice island.

The island was created in the 1960s, and now is used as a car park for tourists, who cannot bring their vehicles into the city. The Venice People Mover connects Tronchetto with Piazzale Roma, the main Venice bus station, which lies at the edge of the city center.

Gallery

References

Buildings and structures completed in the 1960s
Artificial islands of Italy
Islands of the Venetian Lagoon
Transport in Venice
Parking facilities
Road transport in Italy